Feschaeria meditrina is a moth of the Castniidae family. It is known from Brazil. It is often treated as a subspecies of Feschaeria amycus.

Castniidae
Moths described in 1856